George Piro is an [Lebanese-American] special agent in charge (SAC) at the Federal Bureau of Investigation's Miami Field Office. He was the Team Leader and Lead Interrogator of the Saddam Hussein Interrogation Team in 2004.

Saddam Hussein interrogation 
As a relatively new agent (he only had 5 years of experience with the Bureau before being given the assignment to interrogate Saddam), Piro's fluency in Arabic opened high-level opportunities for him during the Iraq War, at a time when approximately 1 in 1000 FBI special agents spoke the language. The television show 60 Minutes revealed in January 2008 that he had secretly gained the confidence of Saddam Hussein while interrogating Hussein while he was imprisoned after the second war in Iraq. During his conversations with Hussein, Piro reported that Hussein had not expected a U.S. invasion of Iraq. Piro also confirmed through their discussions that Iraq did not have weapons of mass destruction at the time of the U.S. invasion in 2003, but that Hussein would not give up attempts to obtain them in order to secure his country from the perceived threat posed by Iran and its weapons program. Further, any links to Bin Laden and Al-Qaeda were denied, as Hussein held himself as a secular ruler and did not believe in the creation of an Islamic state. Hussein mocked Bin Laden saying "You really can't trust anybody with a beard like that".

On July 1, 2009, the National Security Archive declassified and released the official FBI FD-302 forms filed at the time of Saddam's interrogation, detailing 20 formal interviews and 5 casual conversations throughout 2004, much of which were between Piro and Saddam, including details of conversation and thoughts shared by Saddam himself.

Personal life and career 
Born and raised in Beirut, Lebanon of Assyrian heritage, Piro is the son of Mr. & Mrs. Lazar Piro who immigrated to Turlock, California during the Lebanese Civil War when he was 12 years old. Turlock is located in California's San Joaquin Valley, which has a large Assyrian population. After he graduated from high school, Piro enlisted in the United States Air Force and served as a security policeman. After his service in the U.S. Air Force, he began his career in law enforcement with the City of Ceres Police Department in 1989. He went to night school to earn a college degree. Working his way up the ranks in the Ceres Police Department, Piro became a Criminal Investigator II for the Stanislaus County District Attorney's office, where he investigated felony cases involving career criminals and was assigned to the Stanislaus County Drug Enforcement Agency. In 1999, he began his career with the FBI and was assigned to the Phoenix Field Office.

He speaks English, Arabic and Aramaic (Assyrian) fluently as well as French.

By 2007, Piro was serving as Supervisor of the FBI's Joint Terrorism Task Force in the Washington Field Office. Piro was listed as being a Special Agent in Charge of the FBI Field Office in Miami in January 2017 when he served as the agency's spokesman concerning the FBI's investigation of the Fort Lauderdale airport shooting.

On October 18, 2017, FBI Director Christopher Wray announced the appointment of George Piro as the Assistant Director of the International Operations Division at FBI Headquarters in Washington, D.C.

References

External links
FBI Agent: Hussein Didn't Expect Invasion

Living people
United States Air Force airmen
Federal Bureau of Investigation agents
American people of Lebanese-Assyrian descent
Lebanese emigrants to the United States
Year of birth missing (living people)